LANSA Flight 508 was a Lockheed L-188A Electra turboprop, registered OB-R-941, operated as a scheduled domestic passenger flight by Lineas Aéreas Nacionales Sociedad Anonima (LANSA, a Peruvian airline company) which crashed in a thunderstorm en route from Lima to Pucallpa in Peru on 24 December 1971, killing 91 people — all six of its crew and 85 of its 86 passengers. It is the deadliest lightning strike disaster in history.

The sole survivor was 17-year-old Juliane Koepcke, who while strapped to her seat fell  into the Amazon rainforest. She survived the fall and was then able to walk through the jungle for eleven days until being rescued by local fishermen. The Electra was LANSA's last aircraft; the company lost its operating permit eleven days later.

Crash 
LANSA Flight 508 departed Lima's Jorge Chávez International Airport just before noon on Christmas Eve on its way to Iquitos, Peru, with a scheduled stop at Pucallpa. Some evidence showed the crew decided to continue the flight despite the hazardous weather ahead, apparently because of pressure to meet the holiday schedule. Peruvian investigators cited "intentional flight into hazardous weather conditions" as a cause of the crash.

Death toll and sole survivor 

The sole survivor was 17-year-old Juliane Koepcke. Despite a broken collarbone, a deep gash to her right arm, an eye injury, and concussion, she was able to trek through the dense Amazon jungle for 10 days and found shelter in a hut. Local fishermen found her and took her by canoe back to civilization.]]
As many as 14 other passengers were also later found to have survived the initial crash, but died awaiting rescue.

In popular culture
The movie Miracles Still Happen (1974) is based on the story. Koepcke's story was also told in the documentary film Wings of Hope (1998) by director Werner Herzog. Koepcke's memoir Als ich vom Himmel fiel was published by the German publisher Piper Malik on March 10, 2011.(The English edition When I Fell From the Sky, was published by Titletown Publishing in November 2011.)

The crash also features in the final season-one episode of the Discovery Channel documentary Aircrash Confidential. The episode was first aired in 2011, and features an interview with Koepcke.

See also 
 List of accidents and incidents involving commercial aircraft
 List of sole survivors of aviation accidents and incidents
 Aeroflot Flight 1492
 LANSA Flight 502
 Northwest Airlines Flight 255
 Pan Am Flight 214, another crash caused by lightning

References

External links 
 Photo of Accident Aircraft on Aviation Safety Site
 Outside Magazine Top Survival Stories (Archive)
 Tournavista, Perú on Falling Rain
 BBC News - Juliane Koepcke: How I survived a plane crash

Airliner accidents and incidents caused by pilot error
Airliner accidents and incidents caused by lightning strikes
Aviation accidents and incidents in Peru
Aviation accidents and incidents in 1971
Accidents and incidents involving the Lockheed L-188 Electra
508
1971 in Peru
1971 meteorology
December 1971 events in South America
1971 disasters in Peru